The Oranges Band is an American indie rock band from Baltimore, Maryland signed with Green Day's original label, Lookout! Records. Fronted by ex-Spoon bassist Roman Kuebler, The Oranges' first record, The Five Dollars EP, was released on Baltimore-based label Morphius Records. Subsequent touring and critical praise earned the band a deal with Lookout, culminating in the release of an EP, album, and several videos, leading up to, according to many critics, their strongest album to that point, The World & Everything in It. In 2004, Morphius released a retrospective compiling the band's earlier work, including The Five Dollars EP, the now out-of-print 900 Miles of Fucking Hell EP, as well as various unreleased tracks entitled Two Thousands.  In 2008, with a new lineup that included Pat Martin on bass and guest guitarist Doug Gillard, the band released their third full-length The Oranges Band are Invisible.

Discography 
 $5 EP (2000)
 Nine Hundred Miles of Fucking Hell (2001)
 On TV (2002)
 All Around (2003)
 Two Thousands (2004)
 The World & Everything in It (2005)
 The Oranges Band Are Invisible (2008)

References

External links
Morphius Records
Lookout Records
The Oranges Band home page
The Oranges Band Myspace page
 Lookout Records official website
 Entertainment Weekly review of All Around
 Extensive Interview with singer Roman Kuebler for Aural States (Apr 2010)

Indie rock musical groups from Maryland
Musical groups from Baltimore